Copper Peak is a ski flying hill designed by Lauren Larsen and located in Ironwood, Michigan, United States. It was built in 1969 and inaugurated one year later. The site was listed on the National Register of Historic Places in 1973 and designated a Michigan State Historic Site in 1971. The site is currently used as a summer tourist attraction.

History

Copper Mining 
In 1845, the Chippewa Copper Mining Company began mining work here, sinking a tunnel into the granite rock. They produced no copper and eventually closed. Around 1900 the Old Peak Company made further explorations, with no production. The 1845 tunnel is still visible.

1969: Built 
It all started in 1968 when a delegation from Gogebic Range Ski Club from Ironwood, Michigan came to visit civil/structural engineer Lauren Larsen in Duluth, Minnesota.

1970: Inaugurated 
Built in 1970, Copper Peak remains the only ski flying facility in the Western Hemisphere. There have been no flights at Copper Peak since 1994. An exhibition tournament was announced for 2014 but was canceled.

Between 1970 and 1994 there were ten competitions sanctioned by FIS and additional two international events were held. The hill was expanded in the 1980s, but the profile is still outdated compared to current standards.

Renovation 
The Copper Peak, Inc., has established the Copper Peak Organizing Committee for the purposes of raising funds to renovate the ski flying facility for FIS competition. Some improvements to the facilities were made in 2012.

On 14 July 2015 International Ski Federation announced "Copper Peak shall be reactivated" after an inspection of the facility by FIS Race Director Walter Hofer and Hans-Martin Renn who is the chairman of the FIS subcommittee for ski jumping hills. In October 2015, FIS awarded Copper Peak a Grand Prix Summer Series finale event held in September 2017 and a Summer Continental Cup and a Nordic Combined summer event in 2018.

On 30 March 2022, the State of Michigan granted Copper Peak $20 Million for the re-introduction of international ski jumping events at Copper Peak. As of January 2023, construction has begun and is the ski jump is set to reopen in October 2024.

Events

Hill records

Chippewa Hill 

The peak, also known as Chippewa Hill, is a felsite hill about three hundred feet in height. The hill slopes steeply to the north and south, and there is a steep bluff on the east side of the hill. The Copper Peak ski-slide and tower dominates the peak of the hill. The tower sits on concrete footings based in solid rock. An 1845 tunnel and several copper excavation pits are visible on the hill, and are not affected by the construction of the ski-slide.

Mining 

The hill, also known as Chippewa Hill and Old Peak, was the site of a mine owned by the Chippewa Copper Mining Company.  Work began in 1845, but no copper was produced.

See also 

Two other ski jumps located in the Upper Peninsula of Michigan:

Pine Mountain Ski Jump – one of the highest artificially created ski jumps in the world, located near Iron Mountain, Michigan
Suicide Hill Ski Jump – located near Ishpeming, Michigan and the National Ski Hall of Fame

References

External links

Official website copperpeak.com

Buildings and structures in Gogebic County, Michigan
Ski jumping venues in the United States
Sports venues in Michigan
Michigan State Historic Sites
Ski flying venues
Ski areas and resorts in Michigan
Ski jumping venues in Michigan
Hills of the United States
Sports venues completed in 1969
Tourist attractions in Gogebic County, Michigan
1969 establishments in Michigan